Orašac may refer to:

 Orašac, Bihać, a village in Bosnia and Herzegovina
 Orašac, Novi Travnik, a village in Bosnia and Herzegovina
 Orašac, Prozor, a village in Bosnia and Herzegovina
 Orašac, Croatia, a village in southern Croatia
 Orašac, Kumanovo, a village in North Macedonia
 Orašac (Aranđelovac), a village in Serbia
 Orašac (Leskovac), a village in Serbia
 Orašac (Obrenovac), a village in Serbia
 Orašac (Prijepolje), a village in Serbia
 Orašac (Šabac), a village in Serbia